Bedd-y-Cawr Hillfort, or Bedd y Cawr Hillfort, is an Iron Age hillfort on a natural inland promontory in the community of Cefnmeiriadog in Denbighshire in North Wales. The name of the hillfort translates from the Welsh as Giant's Tomb.

Description
The hillfort is sited at the end of the Cefn Meiriadog ridge of the Rhos Hills which offers views over the River Elwy valley in an area dominated by hillforts. On the sides on the west and east it is protected by natural outcrops of limestone.

Recent history
Bedd-y-Cawr was visited by the Royal Commission on the Ancient and Historical Monuments in Wales and Monmouthshire in 1912 and Bedd-y-Cawr and designated as a scheduled monument in 1927.

The area of the designated site was expanded in 1998 (formerly just the interior was scheduled) and is classed as a defensive prehistoric hillfort.

See also
Moel y Gaer (hillfort in the community of Bodfari  to the east)

References

Further reading

External links
 - Coflein mapping of Bedd-y-Cawr Hillfort

Hillforts in Denbighshire
Scheduled monuments in Denbighshire